This list of tallest buildings in Auckland ranks skyscrapers in Auckland, New Zealand by height. The tallest building (with continuous occupiable floors) in Auckland is The PWC Tower, which rises . However the tallest structure in Auckland is the Sky Tower, which rises .

Tallest buildings
This includes spires and architectural details and includes antenna masts. Existing structures are included for ranking purposes based on present height. Towers, such as the Sky Tower are included for comparison, but because they are not skyscrapers they are not included in the rankings.

Tallest under construction, approved, and proposed
This is a list of the buildings above 70 m in Auckland:

Cancelled

History

See also

 List of tallest structures in New Zealand
 List of tallest buildings in Christchurch
 List of tallest buildings in Wellington
 List of tallest buildings in Oceania

References 

Buildings and structures in Auckland
Tallest
Auckland